Martin Boszorád (born 13 November 1989) is a Slovak football defender who currently plays for ASV Nickelsdorf in Austria.

References

External links
 FC Nitra profile

Ex-Clubs 
Nitra U19 (2008/2009)

FC Nitra (2014/2015)

Ruzomberok (2016/2017)

Zlate Moravce (2017/2018)

ETO FC Győr (2017/2018)

1989 births
Living people
Slovak footballers
Association football midfielders
FC Nitra players
MFK Ružomberok players
FC ViOn Zlaté Moravce players
Slovak Super Liga players
Sportspeople from Nitra